Beijing People's Art Theatre (北京人民艺术剧院/北京人民藝術劇院) is a theatre company that was founded in June 1952 by drama master Cao Yu. 
Since its founding, the company has produced nearly 300 dramas of different styles, from classic Chinese themes to adaptations of Molière.  The company is based in the Capital Theatre in Beijing.
 
Through the 1960s, it was known primarily for staging the representative works of master playwrights Guo Moruo, Lao She, Cao Yu and Tian Han. Since the 1980s, the theater has introduced nearly 80 new dramas by 27 award-winning playwrights, including Signal Alarm, the first play written by Gao Xingjian, and his most celebrated drama Bus Stop.

In 1980, the company toured outside China for the first time, performing Lao She's masterpiece "Tea House", the company's signature work, in Japan and Western Europe. The company broke more new ground in 1983 when it invited playwright Arthur Miller to direct a production of what was seen at the time as a uniquely American drama "Death of a Salesman," an experience Miller recounted in the form of a day-to-day diary in his book Salesman in Beijing (1985).

In 2005, the company made its United States debut with productions of "Tea House" at the John F. Kennedy Center for the Performing Arts and the Michael Schimmel Center for the Arts at Pace University in New York City.

References

Theatres in Beijing
1952 establishments in China
Arts organizations established in 1952
Theatre companies in Beijing